Paul Ricard (1909–1997) was French industrialist.

Paul Ricard may also refer to:

 Circuit Paul Ricard, motorsports racetrack at Le Castellet, near Marseille, France
 Paul Ricard (trimaran),  a speed record hydrofoiled trimaran

See also
 Ricard (drink), the first brand of pastis
 Ricard, a surname
 Paul (disambiguation)
 Richard (disambiguation)
 Paul Richard (1667–1756), mayor of New York City